The Streetsweeper, Vol. 1 is the debut studio album by American DJ DJ Kay Slay, released on May 20, 2003 through Columbia Records.

Track listing

Chart history

References

2003 debut albums
Albums produced by Buckwild
Albums produced by Dame Grease
Albums produced by DJ Scratch
Albums produced by E-A-Ski
Albums produced by Eminem
Albums produced by Havoc (musician)
Albums produced by the Heatmakerz
Albums produced by Jazze Pha
Albums produced by Nottz
Albums produced by Wyclef Jean
Columbia Records albums
DJ Kay Slay albums